James Donald Duffey, Jr. (June 6, 1950 – September 10, 2019) was the Virginia Secretary of Technology from 2010 to 2014, serving under Governor Bob McDonnell. At the time of his appointment, he was president and CEO of Duff Consulting which he founded after 24 years at Electronic Data Systems and was vice chairman of the Northern Virginia Technology Council.

References

External links
 Virginia Secretary of Technology

1950 births
2019 deaths
State cabinet secretaries of Virginia
University of Virginia alumni
New England Law Boston alumni
American chief executives
People from Cambridge, Massachusetts